Midway is an unincorporated community in Oregon County, in the U.S. state of Missouri.

Midway was so named on account of its location at the midpoint between Alton and Thayer.

References

Unincorporated communities in Oregon County, Missouri
Unincorporated communities in Missouri